The 2020 PFF National Challenge Cup was the 29th edition of domestic association football cup competition in Pakistan. 28 teams participated in the competition, commencing from 30 November and concluding on 20 December 2020. The competition was held in Lahore, with Punjab Stadium and Fame FC Ground hosting all the matches.

WAPDA F.C. won their maiden title after beating SSGC F.C. 1-0 in the final.

Teams 
The 28 teams participating in the tournament were as follows:

 Notes
 TH = Challenge Cup title holders; PPL = Pakistan Premier League winners

References 

Pakistan National Football Challenge Cup
2020 domestic association football cups
2020 Asian domestic association football cups
2020 in Pakistani sport
Football competitions in Pakistan
November 2020 sports events in Pakistan
2020s in Pakistan
2020s in Lahore
Sport in Lahore